Helmond Brandevoort is a railway station in Brandevoort near Helmond, Netherlands. The station opened on 10 December 2006 and is on the Venlo–Eindhoven railway. The building work was not completed and finally finished on 15 June 2007. It was built in the same style as the neighbourhood of Brandevoort.

The station has 2 platforms. Train services are operated by Nederlandse Spoorwegen.

Train service
The following services calls at Helmond Brandevoort :
2x per hour local services (sprinter) 's-Hertogenbosch - Eindhoven - Deurne

External links
NS website 
Dutch Public Transport journey planner 

Brandevoort
Railway stations opened in 2006
Railway stations on the Staatslijn E